Andrej Pernecký (born 16 March 1991) is a Slovak football goalkeeper who currently plays for the Corgoň Liga club FK DAC 1904 Dunajská Streda.

External links

References

1991 births
Living people
Footballers from Bratislava
Slovak footballers
Association football goalkeepers
Bognor Regis Town F.C. players
AEL Limassol players
FK Viktoria Žižkov players
FC DAC 1904 Dunajská Streda players
Slovak Super Liga players
Cypriot First Division players
Slovak expatriate footballers
Expatriate footballers in England
Expatriate footballers in Cyprus
Expatriate footballers in the Czech Republic
Slovak expatriate sportspeople in England
Slovak expatriate sportspeople in Cyprus
Slovak expatriate sportspeople in the Czech Republic